Geteuma peraffinis is a species of beetle in the family Cerambycidae. It was described by Stephan von Breuning in 1971. It is known from Madagascar.

References

Crossotini
Beetles described in 1971